Gia mia choufta Touristries ( For A Handful of Women Tourists) is a 1971 Greek comedy film directed by Errikos Thalassinos and starring Alekos Alexandrakis, Kaiti Papanika and Katerina Gioulaki.

Cast

Alekos Alexandrakis ..... Menelaos
Kaiti Papanika ..... Helen
Katerina Gioulaki ..... mayor
Sotiris Moustakas ..... police captain
Stefanos Stratigos ..... Peter
Thodoros Katsadramis ..... Chariton
Eleni Anousaki ..... Katina

External links

Gia mia choufta touristries at cine.gr 

1971 films
1971 comedy films
1970s Greek-language films
Greek comedy films
Films shot in Lesbos